William Street is a street in the Financial District of Lower Manhattan, New York City. It runs generally southwest to northeast, crossing Wall Street and terminating at Broad Street and Spruce Street, respectively. Between Beaver Street and Broad Street, the street is known as South William Street. Between Beekman Street and Spruce Street, in front of New York Downtown Hospital, William Street is a pedestrian-only street.

History 

It is one of the oldest streets in Manhattan and can be seen in the 1660 Castello Plan of New Amsterdam. It was originally called King Street, but was later renamed William after Willem Beekman who arrived in New Amsterdam in 1647 as a fellow passenger of Peter Stuyvesant. Beekman got his start as a Dutch West India Company clerk and later served nine terms as mayor of the young port city.

The buildings on South William Street 13-23 were reconstructed in the Dutch revival style by architect C. P. H. Gilbert and later Edward L. Tilton in the early 1900s, evoking New Amsterdam with the use of red brick as building material and the features of stepped gables. These buildings are part of the Stone Street Historic District, designated in 1996 by the New York City Landmarks Preservation Commission.

Buildings 

The buildings on William Street tend to cater to the financial underpinnings of the area and include luxury condominiums, offices, and at least one conference center. Notable buildings fronting William Street include:
1 William Street
13-23 South William Street, constructed in Dutch Colonial Revival architecture
85 Broad Street (Goldman Sachs)
2 South William Street (Delmonico's Restaurant)
15 William
20 Exchange Place
55 Wall Street
48 Wall Street
28 Liberty Street
33 Liberty Street (Federal Reserve Bank of New York)
130 William
New York Downtown Hospital
Pace University
The New School
Our Lady of Victory Church (Manhattan)

Transportation
The IRT Broadway – Seventh Avenue Line of the New York City Subway runs under William Street, with stops at Wall Street and Fulton Street.

References

External links

Financial District, Manhattan
Streets in Manhattan